Joe Milton III (born March 6, 2000) is an American football quarterback for the Tennessee Volunteers. He previously played for Michigan.

Early years
Milton attended Olympia High School in Orlando, Florida. He committed to the University of Michigan to play college football.

College career

Michigan
Milton spent his first two years at Michigan (2018, 2019) as a backup to starter Shea Patterson. During those two years, he played in eight games, completing 6 of 11 passes for 117 yards, one touchdown, two interceptions and also had two rushing touchdowns. 

Milton competed with Dylan McCaffrey to be Michigan's starter in 2020. Milton was considered the favorite after McCaffrey decided to transfer. Due to the COVID-19 pandemic, Michigan's season was shortened to only six games. Milton started the first three games but steadily lost more playing time to Cade McNamara as the season progressed. Milton passed for 1,077 yards, four passing touchdowns, and four interceptions to go along with 38 carries for 109 rushing yards and one rushing touchdown in Michigan's 2–4 season.

Tennessee
Milton transferred to Tennessee, where he was named the team's starter. He was benched in favor of Hendon Hooker, a fellow transfer quarterback from Virginia Tech, after an injury against Pittsburgh. He recorded a passing touchdown against #1 Georgia in relief in the 41–17 loss on November 13. Milton played in a relief role in six games the rest of the 2021 season.

In the 2022 season, Hooker was the primary starter for the 11–2 Volunteers. Milton played the backup role for most the season. He had productive outings in relief of Hooker with multiple games going over 100 yards passing and scoring at least one passing touchdown. On November 19, against South Carolina, Hooker sustained a season-ending ACL injury, making Milton the starter for the rest of the season. Milton made his first start of the season against Vanderbilt. He passed for 147 yards and a touchdown in the 56–0 victory. Tennessee qualified for the Orange Bowl against #7 Clemson. In the game, Milton passed for 251 yards and three touchdowns in the 31–14 victory to earn MVP honors.

College statistics

References

External links
Tennessee Volunteers bio
Michigan Wolverines bio

2000 births
Living people
People from Pahokee, Florida
Sportspeople from the Miami metropolitan area
Players of American football from Florida
African-American players of American football
American football quarterbacks
Michigan Wolverines football players
Tennessee Volunteers football players
21st-century African-American sportspeople
20th-century African-American sportspeople